

Player awards (NBA)

Regular Season MVP 

 Moses Malone, Houston Rockets

NBA Finals MVP 
 Magic Johnson, Los Angeles Lakers

Collegiate awards
 Men
John R. Wooden Award: Ralph Sampson, Virginia
Frances Pomeroy Naismith Award: Jack Moore, Nebraska
Associated Press College Basketball Player of the Year: Ralph Sampson, Virginia
NCAA basketball tournament Most Outstanding Player: Akeem Olajuwon, Houston
Associated Press College Basketball Coach of the Year: Ralph Miller, Oregon State
Naismith Outstanding Contribution to Basketball: Curt Gowdy
 Women
Wade Trophy: Pam Kelly, Louisiana Tech

Naismith Memorial Basketball Hall of Fame
Class of 1982:
Everett Case
Clarence Gaines
Slater Martin
Frank Ramsey
Willis Reed

Births
January 6 — Gilbert Arenas
November 3 — Janel McCarville

Deaths
January 5 — Jack Kiley, American NBA player (born 1929)
January 21 — Jules Bender, American college All-American (Long Island) and original ABL player (born 1914)
January 21 — Ned Irish, American Hall of Fame president of the New York Knicks (born 1905)
January 31 — Étienne Onimus, French Olympic player (born 1907)
February 21 — Jim Bradley,  American ABA and CBA player (born 1952)
April 10 — Vic Hanson, Hall of Fame college player (Syracuse) (born 1903)
April 27 — Herbert Niiler, Estonian Olympic player (born 1905)
June 13 — Jim Montgomery, American NBL player (born 1915)
June 21 — Fred Zollner, American Hall of Fame professional owner (Fort Wayne Pistons) (born 1901)
July 6 — Junior Saffer, American NBL player (born 1918)
September 17 — Raúl Fernández, Mexican Olympic player (born 1905)
October 21 — Stan Zadel, American NBL player (born 1916)
October 23 — Gary Suiter, American NBA player (born 1942)
November 8 — Roy Leenig, American NCAA player and coach (born 1920)
December 9 — Janusz Patrzykont, Polish Olympic player (born 1912)
December 17 — Franco Marquicias, Filipino Olympic player (born 1905)

See also
 1982 in sports

References